The 1874 Wakefield by-election was fought on 4 May 1874.  The byelection was fought due to the void Election of the incumbent Conservative MP, Edward Green.  It was won by the Conservative candidate Thomas Kemp Sanderson.

References

1874 in England
Elections in Wakefield
1874 elections in the United Kingdom
By-elections to the Parliament of the United Kingdom in West Yorkshire constituencies
19th century in Yorkshire